Isi is a personal name; sometimes an abbreviation of Isidore, Isaac, Israel, Isabel, or Islam, or the equivalents in another language.
 Isi (footballer, born October 1995), Isaac Gómez Sánchez, a Spanish football midfielder
 Isi Gabsa (born 1995), Isabell Gabsa, a German professional golfer
 Isi Leibler (1934–2021), a Belgian-born Australian-Israeli Jewish activist
 Isi Metzstein (1928–2012), Isi Israel Metzstein, a German-born architect in Scotland
 Isi Naisarani (born 1995), Fijian–Australian rugby union player
 Isi Palazón (born 1994), Isaac Palazón Camacho, a Spanish football left winger 
 Isi Ros (born 1995), Isidro Ros Ríos, a Spanish football winger
 Isi Siddiqui, Islam A. Siddiqui, American agricultural scientist and administrator
 Isi Tu'ungafasi (born 1995), Isileli J. Tu'ungafasi, Tongan–New Zealand rugby union player
 Isi Yanouka, Yitzhak Yanouka, Israeli diplomat

See also
 Isi (disambiguation)
 Izzy, similar short name
 Isi & Ossi, a 2020 German romantic comedy film 
 Joy Isi Bewaji, Nigerian writer

Hypocorisms